Thomas Brett Johns (born 21 February 1992) is a Welsh professional mixed martial artist who currently competes in the bantamweight division of Bellator MMA. Prior to signing with Bellator, Johns competed for the Ultimate Fighting Championship (UFC). A professional competitor since 2012, he has also formerly competed for Cage Warriors and Titan FC, and was Bantamweight Champion for both promotions. As of 28 February 2023, he is ranked #8 in the Bellator Bantamweight Rankings.

Background
Johns was born and raised by a single mother in Pontarddulais. He has an older sister and a younger brother. Brett started training judo in a club run by his to-be-stepfather at the age of four. While avidly training judo, he started training Brazilian jiu-jitsu on his stepfather's advice to improve his ground game at the age of 16. While training jiu-jitsu under Chris Rees, Johns eventually grew an interest towards mixed arts.

Mixed martial arts career

Early career
Johns made his mixed martial arts debut as an amateur in 2011 where he compiled an undefeated record of 4–0. He turned professional in 2012 and competed on the regional circuit with stints in Cage Warriors Fighting Championship and Titan Fighting Championships where he was the Bantamweight Champion for each promotion.

Johns signed with the UFC in 2016.

Ultimate Fighting Championship
Johns made his promotional debut on 19 November 2016 against Kwan Ho Kwak at UFC Fight Night 99. He won the fight via unanimous decision.

Johns was expected to face Ian Entwistle on 18 March 2017 at UFC Fight Night 107. Entwistle missed weight at the weigh-ins – coming in at 139lbs, 3lbs over the bantamweight limit of 136lbs. He forfeited 20% of his fight purse to his opponent. The following day, Entwistle's medical clearance was revoked following a trip the hospital and the bout was cancelled.

Johns was expected to face Mitch Gagnon on 16 July 2017 at UFC Fight Night 113. However, Gagnon was removed from the card on 27 June and replaced by Albert Morales. Johns won the bout by unanimous decision.

Johns faced Joe Soto on 1 December 2017 at The Ultimate Fighter 26 Finale. Johns won the bout by submission due to a calf slicer (the 2nd Calf Slicer in UFC history). This win earned him Performance of the Night bonus.

Johns faced Aljamain Sterling on 21 April 2018 at UFC Fight Night 128. He lost the fight by unanimous decision.

Johns faced Pedro Munhoz on 4 August 2018 at UFC 227. He lost the fight by unanimous decision.

Johns faced Tony Gravely on 25 January 2020 at UFC Fight Night 166. He won the fight via a rear-naked choke in round three. This win earned him the Fight of the Night award.

Johns faced Montel Jackson on 19 July 2020 at UFC Fight Night 172. He won the fight via unanimous decision.

Bellator MMA
On 2 October 2020, Johns revealed he had signed a multi-fight deal with Bellator MMA after testing free agency when his UFC contract expired. Johns was expected to make his Bellator debut on 21 May 2021 at Bellator 259 against Matheus Mattos. However, Mattos pulled out from the bout after contracting COVID-19 and was replaced by Former Titan FC Bantamweight Champion Danny Sabatello. Johns lost the bout via unanimous decision.

Johns was scheduled to face Érik Pérez on 16 October 2021 at Bellator 268. However on 5 October it was announced that Perez was injured and the bout was scrapped.

Johns faced Khurshed Kakhorov on 25 February 2022 at Bellator 275. He won the bout via ground and pound TKO in the third round.

Johns was scheduled to face James Gallagher on 23 September 2022 at Bellator 285. However in August, it was announced that Gallagher pulled out of the bout due to unknown reasons. Jordan Winski was picked as a replacement for Gallagher. Johns won the bout via unanimous decision.

Championships and accomplishments

Mixed martial arts
Ultimate Fighting Championship
Performance of the Night (one time) vs. Joe Soto
 Fight of the Night (One time) 
Titan FC
Titan FC Bantamweight Championship (one time; former)
Cage Warriors
CWFC Bantamweight Championship (one time; former)
Pain Pit Fight Night
PPFN Bantamweight (145 lbs) Championship
Sherdog
UFC/MMA 'Submission of the Year' 2017 – Top 5 List No. 4  vs. Joe Soto
MMADNA.nl
2017 Submission of the Year (Calf Slicer vs. Joe Soto at The Ultimate Fighter 26 Finale).

Mixed martial arts record

|-
|Win
|align=center|19–3
|Jordan Winski
|Decision (unanimous)
|Bellator 285
|
|align=center|3
|align=center|5:00
|Dublin, Ireland
|
|-
|Win
|align=center|18–3
|
|TKO (punches)
|Bellator 275
|
|align=center|3
|align=center|3:00
|Dublin, Ireland
|
|-
|Loss
|align=center|17–3
|Danny Sabatello
|Decision (unanimous)
|Bellator 259 
|
|align=center|3
|align=center|5:00
|Uncasville, Connecticut, United States
|
|-
|Win
|align=center|17–2
|Montel Jackson
|Decision (unanimous)
|UFC Fight Night: Figueiredo vs. Benavidez 2 
|
|align=center|3
|align=center|5:00
|Abu Dhabi, United Arab Emirates
|
|-
|Win
|align=center|16–2
|Tony Gravely
|Submission (rear-naked choke)
|UFC Fight Night: Blaydes vs. dos Santos 
|
|align=center|3
|align=center|2:53
|Raleigh, North Carolina, United States
|
|-
|Loss
|align=center|15–2
|Pedro Munhoz
|Decision (unanimous)
|UFC 227 
|
|align=center|3
|align=center|5:00
|Los Angeles, California, United States
|
|- 
|Loss
|align=center|15–1
|Aljamain Sterling
|Decision (unanimous)
|UFC Fight Night: Barboza vs. Lee
|
|align=center|3
|align=center|5:00
|Atlantic City, New Jersey, United States
|
|-
|Win
|align=center|15–0
|Joe Soto
|Submission (calf slicer)
|The Ultimate Fighter: A New World Champion Finale 
|
|align=center|1
|align=center|0:30
|Las Vegas, Nevada, United States
|
|-
|Win
|align=center|14–0
|Albert Morales
|Decision (unanimous)
|UFC Fight Night: Nelson vs. Ponzinibbio 
|
|align=center|3
|align=center|5:00
|Glasgow, Scotland
|
|-
|Win
|align=center|13–0
|Kwan Ho Kwak
|Decision (unanimous)
|UFC Fight Night: Mousasi vs. Hall 2
|
|align=center| 3
|align=center| 5:00
|Belfast, Northern Ireland
|
|-
|Win
|align=center|12–0
|Anthony Gutierrez
|Decision (split)
|Titan FC 34 
|
|align=center| 5
|align=center| 5:00
|Kansas City, Missouri, United States
|
|-
|Win
|align=center|11–0
|Walel Watson
|Submission (rear-naked choke)
|Titan FC 33
|
|align=center| 2
|align=center| 3:06
|Mobile, Alabama, United States
|
|-
|Win
|align=center|10–0
|James Brum
|Decision (unanimous)
|Cage Warriors FC 67 
|
|align=center|5
|align=center|5:00
|Swansea, Wales
|
|-
|Win
|align=center|9–0
|Jordan Desborough
|Decision (split)
|Cage Warriors FC 59 
|
|align=center|5
|align=center|5:00
|Cardiff, Wales
|
|-
|Win
|align=center|8–0
|David Haggstrom
|Decision (unanimous)
|Cage Warriors FC 59 
|
|align=center|3
|align=center|5:00
|Cardiff, Wales
|
|-
|Win
|align=center|7–0
|James MacCallister
|TKO (punches)
|Cage Warriors FC 54 
|
|align=center|2
|align=center|3:23
|Cardiff, Wales
|
|-
|Win
|align=center|6–0
|Joe Orrey 
|Submission (armbar)
|Pain Pit Fight Night 6
|
|align=center|1
|align=center|3:59
|Newport, Wales
|
|-
|Win
|align=center|5–0
|Barrie Monty
|TKO (punches)
|Bad Blood Fight Night 2
|
|align=center|1
|align=center|1:17
|Llanelli, Wales
|
|-
|Win
|align=center|4–0
|Sam Gilbert	
|Decision (unanimous)
|Cage Warriors FC 49 
|
|align=center|3
|align=center|5:00
|Cardiff, Wales
|
|-
|Win
|align=center|3–0
|Kyle Prosser
|Decision (unanimous)
|Pain Pit Fight Night 4
|
|align=center|3
|align=center|5:00
|Newport, Wales
|
|-
|Win
|align=center|2–0
|Arunis Klimavicius
|Submission (triangle choke)
|Celtic Battle Fight Night
|
|align=center|1
|align=center|2:31
|Carmarthen, Wales
|
|-
|Win
|align=center|1–0
|Ben Wood 
|Submission (rear-naked choke)
|Pain Pit Fight Night 3
|
|align=center|1
|align=center|2:04
|Newport, Wales
|

See also
 List of current Bellator fighters 
 List of male mixed martial artists

References

External links
 
 

1992 births
Living people
Welsh male judoka
Sportspeople from Swansea
Bantamweight mixed martial artists
Welsh male mixed martial artists
Mixed martial artists utilizing judo
Mixed martial artists utilizing Muay Thai
Mixed martial artists utilizing Brazilian jiu-jitsu
Welsh practitioners of Brazilian jiu-jitsu
Welsh Muay Thai practitioners
People awarded a black belt in Brazilian jiu-jitsu
Lightweight mixed martial artists
Featherweight mixed martial artists
People educated at Ysgol Gyfun Gŵyr
Ultimate Fighting Championship male fighters